Unstoppable is a 2004 American action film directed by David Carson and starring Wesley Snipes, Jacqueline Obradors, Stuart Wilson and Kim Coates. The film was released in the United States on October 30, 2004.

Plot
A former CIA agent and ex-Special Forces member Dean Cage (Wesley Snipes), is in a rehab program, haunted by a botched mission in Bosnia which resulted in the execution of his best friend Scott (Cristian Solimeno). While in a restaurant waiting for his girlfriend, Baltimore Police Detective Amy Knight (Jacqueline Obradors), who happens to be Scott's sister, he is mistakenly believed to be a CIA agent involved with a stolen military experimental truth serum. He is abducted by the real thieves and injected with the drug, which makes him relive the moments from the failed Bosnian mission and not able to discern who are his allies and who are his enemies. Amy has six hours to find the antidote and save Dean's life.

Cast

 Wesley Snipes as Dean Cage
 Jacqueline Obradors as Detective Amy Knight
 Stuart Wilson as Mr. Sullivan
 Kim Coates as Peterson
 Mark A. Sheppard as Leitch
 Adewale Akinnuoye-Agbaje as Agent Junod
 Vincent Riotta as Detective Jay Miller
 David Schofield as Dr. Collins
 Nicholas Aaron as McNab
 Kim Thomson as Agent Kennedy
 Jo Stone-Fewings as Agent Gabriel
 Cristian Solimeno as Scott Knight
 Gary Oliver as Sullivan's Driver
 Andrew Pleavin as Cherney
 Raicho Vasilev as St. Nevis Guard #1
 David Fleeshman as St. Nevis Guard #2
 Velizar Binev as The Buyer
 Asen Blatechki as Sniper

Production

Filming
Unstoppable was filmed in Bulgaria and Los Angeles, California in 42 days on March 2 and April 13, 2003.

Music
The credit song is the hiphop track "Move" by Leroy and Denoyd.

Release

Home media
DVD was released in Region 1 in the United States on November 23, 2004, and also Region 2 in the United Kingdom on 24 January 2005, it was distributed by Columbia TriStar Home Entertainment.

External links
 
 

2004 films
2004 action films
2000s American films
2000s chase films
2000s English-language films
American action films
American chase films
American police detective films
Films about the Central Intelligence Agency
Films directed by David Carson
Films produced by Boaz Davidson
Films scored by Louis Febre
Films set in Baltimore
Films set in Los Angeles
Films shot in Bulgaria
Nu Image films